Charles Culling Smith, sometimes called Culling Charles Smith (c. 1775 – 26 May 1853) was a British politician and courtier.

Family

He was the son of Charles Smith, Governor of Madras, and nephew of Sir Culling Smith, 1st Baronet.

On 2 August 1799 he married Lady Anne Fitzroy (13 March 1768 – 16 December 1844), widow of the Hon. Henry Fitzroy (13 September 1765 – 19 March 1794; fourth son of Charles Fitzroy, 1st Baron Southampton) and only daughter of Garret Wesley, 1st Earl of Mornington. By this marriage he gained two stepdaughters:
 Anne Caroline Fitzroy, died 16 December 1835
 Georgiana Frederica Fitzroy (3 October 1792 – 11 May 1821), married 25 July 1814 Henry Somerset, Marquess of Worcester, with two daughters.
His marriage to Lady Anne produced a further two children, a daughter and a son:
 Emily Frances Smith (3 March 1800 – 2 October 1889), married 29 June 1822 her half-sister's widower Lord Worcester, who succeeded his father as 7th Duke of Beaufort in 1835. They had one son and six daughters.
 Frederick William Culling Smith (c1802 - died 19 June 1828), a godson of the Duke of York. He was made a Page of Honour on 13 March 1812 and commissioned as a Cornet in the 2nd Dragoon Guards on 22 April 1819. He transferred into the Coldstream Guards as an Ensign on 18 January 1820 and reached the rank of Lieutenant in that regiment before promotion to the Royal Horse Guards as a Captain on 2 January 1823. On 1 August 1826 he was promoted to the rank of Major of Infantry on the unattached list, and joined the 80th Regiment of Foot on 17 January 1828. He died at Malta later that year, aged twenty-six.

Charles Culling Smith and Lady Anne lived in a grace-and-favour residence at Apartment 8, Hampton Court Palace.

Life
Charles Culling Smith's brother-in-law, the Marquess Wellesley, became Foreign Secretary in the Tory government of Spencer Perceval in 1809, and Culling Smith was appointed Under-Secretary of State for Foreign Affairs on 13 December that year, serving until 27 February 1812. On 1 June 1812 he was one of the Esquires to his brother-in-law the Earl of Wellington at the latter's installation (by proxy) as a Knight Companion of the Order of the Bath.

Culling Smith served as an equerry to the Duke of York, and was present in that capacity at the funeral of Queen Charlotte on 8 December 1818, while his son was there as Page of Honour. On 14 August 1820 Culling Smith and his wife, son, daughter and step-daughters were among the mourners at the funeral of the Duchess of York. His last service as equerry was at the Duke of York's funeral on 20 January 1827.

On 13 March 1827 Culling Smith was made one of the Commissioners of the Board of Customs, but he continued to attend state occasions including the funeral of the Duke of Gloucester on 11 December 1834 and the Duke of Wellington on 18 November 1852.

References

1775 births
1853 deaths
Civil servants in the Board of Customs
Equerries
Culling Smith Eardley family